Sigered can refer to:

 Sigered of Essex
 Sigered of Kent
 Saint Sigered of Ripon.